Old Wye Church is a historic Episcopal church at Wye Mills, Talbot County, Maryland. It is a one-story, gable-roofed, rectangular brick structure originally constructed in 1717–21. It was extensively renovated in 1854 and restored to its 18th-century appearance in 1947–49.  It embodies the distinctive characteristics of Georgian Anglican architecture in its brick construction, semicircular-arched window openings, shouldered buttresses, rectangular plan, and simple massing.

It was listed on the National Register of Historic Places in 1984.

References

External links

, including photo from 1975, at Maryland Historical Trust
Wye Parish website

Churches in Talbot County, Maryland
Churches on the National Register of Historic Places in Maryland
Episcopal church buildings in Maryland
Churches completed in 1721
18th-century Episcopal church buildings
National Register of Historic Places in Talbot County, Maryland
1721 establishments in the Thirteen Colonies